Kaitlyn Brooke Farrington (born December 18, 1989) is an American former professional snowboarder who grew up on a cattle ranch near Bellevue, Idaho, and now lives in Whitefish, Montana. She won the gold medal in the women's half-pipe competition at the 2014 Winter Olympics in Sochi, Russia. Prior to her Olympic debut, she competed in the 2010 European Winter X Games and won the gold medal. On December 8, 2022, Farrington was announced as a backup crew member of the dearMoon project, a lunar spaceflight mission.

Early life
Farrington was born to parents Gary and Suz Farrington; she has an older sister. The Farringtons own a ranch near Sun Valley, Idaho, and Kaitlyn grew up riding horses. Suz Farrington credited her daughter's smooth style with good balance from riding horses. She was skiing by age three and barrel racing at age five. "She was skiing on a tether for two days, then said, 'I'm done with this stuff,'" remembered Mr. Farrington.

By high school, Farrington was competing as a snowboarder, and her parents had to sell the cows on their ranch to pay for expenses.

Career
Farrington is left-handed and uses a goofy stance. She became the first women's rider to perform a backside 1080. She goes about 9 feet high above the edge of the half-pipe, but considers herself as a more technical rider in order to make up for her height. Farrington has had five wrist surgeries.

 2014 Sochi Olympic Games - Half pipe women - gold medalist
2013 FIS Snowboarding World Championships – Women's halfpipe, 4th place, behind Arielle Gold, Holly Crawford, and Sophie Rodriguez.
2013 World Cup Sochi, 5th place
2013 World Cup Park City, bronze medalist
2013 World Cup Copper Mountain, 5th place
2012 U.S. Grand Prix overall champion
2012 Dew Tour Breckenridge, gold medalist
2011 X Games Aspen, silver medalist
2011 Dew Tour, silver medalist
2010 X Games Europe, gold medalist
2010 Dew Tour, overall champion
2008 Junior World Championships, silver medalist

On January 16, 2015, Farrington announced via Instagram of her retirement from professional snowboarding at only 25 years of age. In October 2014, Farrington was involved in a fall in Austria while trying to execute a frontside 360 off a small jump. Once returning home to Salt Lake City, Farrington went to get an MRI, to find that she had been diagnosed with congenital cervical stenosis, a congenital spine condition. Doctors told her that competitive snowboarding would put her at great risk of extreme injury due to the condition. Farrington has said "I can walk. I can still snowboard, I just have to keep my feet on the ground".

She has been accepted as a backup crewmember for the dearMoon project.

Personal life
Farrington has a cat named Zilla, after Godzilla. She collects refrigerator magnets from her travel stops and loves running and music. Farrington said she was listening to Ghostland Observatory's Give Me The Beat when competing in the 2014 Winter Olympics in Sochi, Russia.

She recently picked up Frisbee golf and tries to surf, which she calls "drowning".

A black diamond run on Sun Valley's Bald Mountain was renamed "Kaitlyn's Bowl" in her honor.

References

External links

1989 births
Living people
American female snowboarders
Medalists at the 2014 Winter Olympics
Olympic gold medalists for the United States in snowboarding
Olympic medalists in snowboarding
People from Hailey, Idaho
Snowboarders at the 2014 Winter Olympics
Sportspeople from Idaho
People from Bellevue, Idaho
X Games athletes
21st-century American women